Aleesha is a female given name, which may refer to:

People
Aleesha Barber (born 1987), Trinidadian sprint hurdler
Aleesha Rome, (born 1981), Australian pop singer
Aleesha Young (born 1984), American bodybuilder

Fictional characters
Aleesha, a character played by Shamila Nazir in the British web series Corner Shop Show.
Aleesha Cook, a Shortland Street character
Aleesha Miller, an EastEnders character

Film
Aleesha (film), a 2004 Konkani language film

See also
Alesha
Alyosha